Originally produced as Konica Minolta AF Zoom DT 11-18mm f/4.5-5.6 (D) (2698-110) by Konica Minolta in 2005, and currently produced by Sony, the Sony α DT 11-18mm f/4.5-5.6 is compatible with cameras using the Minolta A-mount and Sony A-mount lens mounts. The DT designation means this lens is designed to be used with a camera with an APS-C size sensor. When the 1.5× crop factor is considered, the lens has an effective equivalent 16.5–27mm focal length.

See also
 List of Konica Minolta A-mount lenses
 List of Minolta A-mount lenses

Sources
Dyxum lens data

External links
Sony: SAL-1118: 11-18mm F4.5-5.6 lens

11-18
Camera lenses introduced in 2005